Odilio González (born 5 March 1937), known by his stage name , is a Puerto Rican singer, guitarist and music composer who has been singing and composing for more than 65 years. He has mostly played traditional Puerto Rican folkloric music, songs dedicated to Puerto Rico's .

Career
González was born in 1937 in Piletas barrio in Lares, a municipality of Puerto Rico. He became a popular child star after a series of early radio performances in the capital city of San Juan.

González has sung in the island's ancient traditional poetic song form, the décima (also known as "jíbaro" music), as well as performing mainstream pop music. His stage name is "El Jibarito de Lares". He debuted on the New York City stage in 1958, singing before Puerto Ricans in the Teatro Puerto Rico. His first recordings of traditional jíbaro, available from Ansonia Records, were recorded in New York City during that period. Fellow Lares native José Feliciano's singing style was influenced by González during his youth.

González crossed over into pop music in 1962, when he recorded Celos Sin Motivo, composed by Ismael Santiago.

Gonzalez continues to perform around the island as well as on trips to the United States to sing for older Puerto Rican expatriates, including a visit to Hawaii to sing before the Puerto Rican diapora there.

Selected discography
Some of González music includes:

Albums

Singles

See also

 List of Puerto Ricans

References

20th-century Puerto Rican male singers
Living people
People from Lares, Puerto Rico
1937 births